The Jelbart Ice Shelf is an ice shelf about  wide, fronting on the coast of Queen Maud Land, Antarctica, northward of Giaever Ridge. It was mapped by Norwegian cartographers from surveys and air photos by the Norwegian–British–Swedish Antarctic Expedition (1949–1952) and named for John E. Jelbart, an Australian observer with the expedition who drowned near Maudheim Station on February 24, 1951.

See also
Glaciologist Bay

References

Ice shelves of Queen Maud Land
Princess Martha Coast